Peigal Jaakkirathai is a 2016 Indian Tamil-language horror comedy film, written and directed by Kanmani. This is a Tamil remake of Korean movie 'Hello Ghost'. The film stars Jeeva Rathnam and Eshanya, while Thambi Ramaiah, Rajendran and John Vijay in supporting roles. Featuring music composed by Maria Jerald, Peigal Jaakkirathai released on 1 January 2016.

Cast

Jeeva Rathnam as Saravanan
Eshanya Maheshwari as Gayathri
Thambi Ramaiah as Pazhanivel Annachi
Manobala as Gayathri's father
John Vijay as Sagayam
Rajendran as Gayathri's uncle
Naresh as Saravanan's father
V. I. S. Jayapalan as Saravanan's grandfather
Pandi as Annachi's worker 
Halwa Vasu
Mohana Priya as Gayathri's mother
Boys Rajan as Doctor
Tarun Kumar
Theni Murugan
Mippu
Mona Batra
Sandhya Jagarlamudi as Bhavani
Kalavani Devi
Gehana Vasisth as item number

Production
The film was predominantly shot around Chennai, Mahabalipuram and the surrounding areas during June 2015.
 In October 2015, lyricist Kabilan Vairamuthu made a statement denying claims that lyrics of a particular song from the film that he had written had political connotations to it. For another song in the film's soundtrack, Thambi Ramaiah and Rajendran recorded their voices and shot for a promotional video.

In December 2015, Escape Artists Motion Pictures agreed to distribute the film, raising the profile and commercial viability of the project.

Soundtrack 
Soundtrack was composed by debutant Maria Jerald, and lyrics were done by Kabilan Vairamuthu and Viveka. The song "Obama" was well received by the audience. The background score was done by S. P. Venkatesh.

Release
The film opened on 1 January 2016 to mixed reviews, with a critic from Times of India noting "much of the humour is silly and we do experience a twinge of embarrassment for having laughed at the uninspired jokes — but that happens only after the film is over". The critic also likened the film's plot to Massu Engira Masilamani (2015) and Om Shanthi Om (2015), stating that in "less than a year, we have had three Tamil films which have been inspired from the Korean comedy, Hello Ghost (2010)".

References

External links
 

2016 films
2010s Tamil-language films
2016 comedy horror films
Indian comedy horror films